The eastern racer (Coluber constrictor) is a species of nonvenomous snake in the family Colubridae. The species is endemic to North America and Central America. Eleven subspecies, including the nominotypical subspecies, are recognized, which as a group are commonly referred to as the eastern racers. The species is monotypic in the genus Coluber.

Geographic range
C. constrictor is found throughout the United States, east of the Rocky Mountains, but it also ranges north into Canada and south into Mexico, Guatemala, and Belize.

Description
The patterns vary widely among subspecies. Most are solid-colored as their common names imply: black racers, brown racers, tan racers, blue racers, or green racers. "Runner" is sometimes used instead of "racer" in their common names. All subspecies have a lighter-colored underbelly: white, light tan, or yellow in color. Juveniles are more strikingly patterned, with a middorsal row of dark blotches on a light ground color. The tail is unpatterned. As they grow older, the dorsum darkens and the juvenile pattern gradually disappears.

Behavior

The eastern racers are fast-moving, highly active, diurnal snakes. Their diet consists primarily of small rodents, other mammals (as large as small cottontail rabbits), frogs, toads, small turtles, lizards, and other snakes. Some subspecies are known to climb trees to eat eggs and young birds. Juveniles often consume soft-bodied insects and other small invertebrates, as well as small frogs, small reptiles (including lizards and snakes and their eggs), young rodents, and shrews. Despite their specific name, constrictor, they do not really employ constriction, instead simply subduing struggling prey by pinning it bodily, pressing one or two coils against it to hold it in place instead of actually suffocating it. Most smaller prey items are simply swallowed alive.

They are curious snakes with excellent vision and are sometimes seen raising their heads above the height of the grass where they are crawling to view what is around them.  Aptly named, racers are very fast and typically flee from a potential predator. However, once cornered, they put up a vigorous fight, biting hard and often.  They are difficult to handle and will writhe, defecate, and release a foul-smelling musk from their cloacae. Vibrating their tails among dry leaves, racers can sound convincingly like rattlesnakes.

Habitat
C. constrictor is found frequently near water, but also in brush, trash piles, roadsides, and swamps, and in suburbia; it is the most common snake in residential neighborhoods in Florida. It spends most of its time on the ground, but it is a good tree climber and may be found in shrubs and trees where bird nests can be raided for eggs and chicks, as well as small adult birds such as finches, canaries, and thrashers.

Most of the eastern racers prefer open, grassland-type habitats where their keen eyesight and speed can be readily used, but they are also found in light forest and even semiarid regions. They are usually not far from an area of cover for hiding.

Reproduction
In C. constrictor, mating takes place in the spring from April until early June. Around a month later, the female lays three to 30 eggs in a hidden nest site, such as a hollow log, an abandoned rodent burrow, or under a rock. The juveniles hatch in the early fall. A newborn is 8–10 in (20–26 cm) in total length. Maturity is reached around 2 years old. Eastern racers have been known to lay their eggs in communal sites, where a number of snakes, even those from other species, all lay their eggs together.

Symbol

The northern black racer is the state reptile of Ohio.

Subspecies

 Coluber constrictor anthicus (Cope, 1862) – buttermilk racer
 Coluber constrictor constrictor Linnaeus, 1758 – northern black racer
 Coluber constrictor etheridgei Wilson, 1970 – tan racer
 Coluber constrictor flaviventris Say, 1823 – eastern yellow-bellied racer
 Coluber constrictor foxii (Baird & Girard, 1853) – blue racer
 Coluber constrictor helvigularis Auffenberg, 1955 – brown-chinned racer
 Coluber constrictor latrunculus Wilson, 1970 – black-masked racer
 Coluber constrictor oaxaca (Jan, 1863) – Mexican racer
 Coluber constrictor paludicola Auffenberg & Babbitt, 1955 – Everglades racer
 Coluber constrictor priapus Dunn & Wood, 1939 – southern black racer
 Coluber constrictor mormon (Baird & Girard, 1852) – western yellow-bellied racer

Gallery

References

External links
"Black Snakes": Identification and Ecology - University of Florida fact sheet.
Coluber constrictor, University of Michigan, Animal Diversity Web.
Racer, Reptiles and Amphibians of Iowa.

Further reading
Behler, John L.; King, F. Wayne (1979). The Audubon Society Field Guide to North American Reptiles and Amphibians. New York: Alfred A. Knopf. 743 pp., 657 color plates. . (Coluber constrictor, pp. 596–599 + Plates 468, 478, 480, 486).
Boulenger GA (1893). Catalogue of the Snakes in the British Museum (Natural History). Volume I., Containing the Families ... Colubridæ Aglyphæ, part. London: Trustees of the British Museum (Natural History). (Taylor and Francis, printers). xiii + 448 pp. + Plates I-XXVIII. (Zamenis constrictor, pp. 387–388).
Conant, Roger; Bridges, William (1939). What Snake Is That?: A Field Guide to the Snakes of the United States East of the Rocky Mountains. (with 108 drawings by Edmond Malnate). New York and London: D. Appleton-Century Company. Frontispiece map + viii + 163 pp. + Plates A-C, 1-32. (Coluber constrictor, pp. 44–47 + Plate 5, figure 15; Plate 6, figure 16).
Goin, Coleman J.; Goin, Olive B.; Zug, George R. (1978). Introduction to Herpetology, Third Edition. San Francisco: W.H. Freeman and Company. xi + 378 pp. . (Coluber constrictor, pp. 122–123, 322–323).
Linnaeus C (1758). Systema Naturæ per regna tria naturæ, secundum classes, ordines, genera, species, cum characteribus, differentiis, synonymis, locis. Tomus I. Editio Decima, Reformata. Stockholm: L. Salvius. 824 pp. (Coluber constrictor, new species, p. 216). (in Latin).
Morris, Percy A. (1948). Boy's Book of Snakes: How to Recognize and Understand Them. (A volume of the Humanizing Science Series, edited by Jaques Cattell). New York: Ronald Press. viii + 185 pp. (Coluber constrictor, pp. 37–41, 179).
Powell R, Conant R, Collins JT (2016). Peterson Field Guide to Reptiles and Amphibians of Eastern and Central North America, Fourth Edition. Boston and New York: Houghton Mifflin Harcourt. xiv + 494 pp. , 47 plates, 207 Figures. . (Coluber constrictor, pp. 368–370, Figure 176 + Plate 32).
Schmidt, Karl P.; Davis, D. Dwight (1941). Field Book of Snakes of the United States and Canada. New York: G.P. Putnam's Sons. 365 pp. (Coluber constrictor, pp. 125–126 + Plates 4, 13).
Smith, Hobart M.; Brodie, Edmund D. Jr. (1982). Reptiles of North America: A Guide to Field Identification. New York: Golden Press. 240 pp.  (paperback),  (hardcover). (Coluber constrictor, pp. 190–191).
Stebbins RC (2003). A Field Guide to Western Reptiles and Amphibians, Third Edition. The Peterson Field Guide Series ®. Boston and New York: Houghton Mifflin Company. xiii + 533 pp. . (Coluber constrictor, pp. 351–352 + Plate 43 + Map 141).
Wright, Albert Hazen; Wright, Anna Allen (1957). Handbook of Snakes of the United States and Canada. Ithaca and New York: Comstock Publishing Associates, a division of Cornell University Press. 1,105 pp. (in 2 volumes). (Coluber constrictor, pp. 131–152, Figures 42–47, Map 17).
Zim HS, Smith HM (1956). Reptiles and Amphibians: A Guide to Familiar American Species: A Golden Nature Guide. New York: Simon and Schuster. 160 pp. (Coluber constrictor, pp. 85, 156).

Colubrids
Snakes of North America
Reptiles of the United States
Fauna of the Eastern United States
Reptiles of Mexico
Reptiles of Canada
Symbols of Ohio
Monotypic snake genera
Reptiles described in 1758
Taxa named by Carl Linnaeus